Pelagiellidae is an extinct family of Paleozoic fossil 'snails'.  Some material assigned to this taxon represents gastropod molluscs, but some chaeta-bearing specimens first assigned to Pelagiella (now Pseudopelagiella) are perhaps better interpreted as tube-bearing annelid worms.

Mineralogy 

Aragonite, with various microstructures - details in reference

Taxonomy 
The taxonomy of the Gastropoda by Bouchet & Rocroi, 2005 categorizes Pelagiellidae in the superfamilia Pelagielloidea within the 
Paleozoic molluscs of uncertain systematic position. This family has no subfamilies.

According to P. Yu. Parkhaev, the family Pelagiellidae is in the order Pelagiellifomes MacKinnon, 1985 within the subclass Archaeobranchia Parkhaev, 2001, in the class Helcionelloida Peel, 1991.

Genera 
Genera in the family Pelagiellidae include:
 Pelagiella Matthew, 1895 - type genus of the family Pelagiellidae
 Pelagiella atlantoides - synonym: Cyrtolithes atlantoides
 Pelagiella emeishanensis - image
 Proeccyliopterus Kobayashi, 1962
 Protoscaevogyra Kobayashi, 1939
 Cambretina Horný, 1964
 Costipelagiella Horný, 1964

References

External links 

Helcionelloida
Fossils of Georgia (U.S. state)
Paleozoic life of Quebec